Elena-Gabriela Ruse (born 6 November 1997) is a Romanian tennis player. She has career-high WTA rankings of 51 in singles and 55 in doubles. She won her maiden WTA Tour singles title at the 2021 Hamburg European Open. She has also won six singles and ten doubles titles on the ITF Circuit.

Junior career

2012–2015
Ruse won two junior singles titles and eight junior doubles titles. The biggest title of her junior career was the Grade-1 Canadian Open Junior Championships, where she beat Katie Swan in the final. Ruse also reached the semifinals of the 2014 Wimbledon girls' singles event in 2014 and the final of Eddie Herr. On the ITF Junior Circuit, she had a career-high combined ranking of 7, achieved on 18 May 2015.

Professional career

2015–2016: Rise up the rankings, WTA Tour debut
When Ruse finished her junior career, she still did not have a professional ranking. 

In July 2015, Ruse made her WTA Tour main-draw debut as a wildcard at the Bucharest Open in the doubles event, partnering Jaqueline Cristian. She also received a wildcard into the qualifying draw in singles at the same tournament and beat Alexandra Cadantu in the first round. She lost her next match to Maria Sakkari. She reached semifinals at $10k events in Bucharest and Antalya.

In December 2015, Ruse won her first professional singles title at Antalya, beating Ekaterine Gorgodze in the final. She finished 2015 with a year-end ranking of No. 642 in singles and No. 575 in doubles.

In January 2016, she qualified for the $25k event in Sunrise, beating former top-30 player Laura Robson along the way, and reached the quarterfinals. After that event, she won ten singles matches and eight doubles matches in a row and won two singles and two doubles titles at $10k events in Antalya. In March, Ruse reached two straight finals at $10k events in Hammamet, Tunisia. She lost the first one to Claudia Giovine in straight sets, snapping her 14-match winning streak in singles, and in the second one she beat Julia Grabher. At the end of April, Ruse qualified for a $25k event in Chiasso, Switzerland and reached the semifinals, where she lost to fellow qualifier Amanda Carreras.

After taking time off for her high school graduation, Ruse returned to competition in June at the $50k event in Essen, Germany. As the last direct acceptance, Ruse shocked top seed Aliaksandra Sasnovich in three sets for her first win over a top-100 player. Due to rain delays in Essen, she had to play her second-round match the same day and lost in straight sets to qualifier Olga Sáez Larra.

2018-2019: Grand Slam singles debut at Wimbledon, first WTA doubles final
Ruse qualified for her Grand Slam main-draw debut at the 2018 Wimbledon Championships. 

She reached her first WTA tournament final at the 2019 Bucharest Open, partnering again with Jaqueline Cristian; they were defeated by Viktória Kužmová and Kristýna Plíšková in the championship match.

2021: Maiden WTA title, WTA 1000 & top 100 debuts, First Major doubles quarterfinal at US Open
She made her WTA 1000 debut in Indian Wells as a qualifier.

Ruse won her maiden WTA Tour singles title at the Hamburg European Open, defeating Andrea Petkovic in the final. As a result of this successful run, she climbed 65 positions and entered the top 150 in singles at a new career-high of world No. 133. Following her run in Hamburg, Ruse reached a second consecutive final later that month, at the Palermo Open; however, she lost it in straight sets to Danielle Collins. She made her US Open debut as a qualifier, but lost in the first round to Markéta Vondroušová. In doubles at the same tournament she reached her first Major quarterfinal partnering Monica Niculescu. 

She reached another new career-high of No. 83 in the world on 18 October 2021, and finished the year ranked No. 85.

2022: Major debuts at Australian & French Opens & first wins & top-10 win, Career high singles ranking 
In Dubai she qualified into the main draw and defeated world No. 5 and third seed Paula Badosa for her first top-10 win.

She reached a new career-high ranking of No. 51 on 23 May 2022.

2023: Australian Open doubles semifinalist
In doubles at the 2023 Australian Open she reached the semifinals partnering Marta Kostyuk.

She reached the second round at the 2023 Monterrey Open as a qualifier defeating Mérida Open champion Camila Giorgi.

Performance timeline

Only main-draw results in WTA Tour, Grand Slam tournaments, Fed Cup/Billie Jean King Cup and Olympic Games are included in win–loss records.

Singles
Current after the 2023 Monterrey Open.

Doubles
Current after the 2023 Australian Open.

WTA career finals

Singles: 2 (1 title, 1 runner-up)

Doubles: 1 (runner-up)

ITF Circuit finals

Singles: 9 (6 titles, 3 runner–ups)

Doubles: 19 (10 titles, 9 runner–ups)

Top 10 wins

Notes

References

External links

 
 
 

Romanian female tennis players
1997 births
Living people
Tennis players from Bucharest